Abraham Rodriguez Jr. (born in The Bronx, 1960) is a Puerto Rican novelist, short story author and musician who writes in English about the experience of Latinos in the United States. Although he has been living in Germany since the mid-90s, Rodriguez continues to set his stories in the South Bronx. He is part of the Nuyorican Movement.

As a musician, he is the founding member, guitarist and singer for the Berlin-based punk-rock band Urgent Fury.

Life
His work has appeared in Story, Best Stories from New Writers, Chattahoochie Review, Alternative Fiction & Poetry, and Latino Boom: An Anthology of U.S. Latino Literature.

Awards
 1993 New York Times Notable Book of the Year, for The Boy Without A Flag
 1995 American Book Award, for Spidertown
 2000 New York Foundation for the Arts grant
 New York State Council of the Arts, literary panel member

Bibliography

References

External links

20th-century American novelists
21st-century American novelists
American male novelists
Writers from the Bronx
Living people
American Book Award winners
20th-century American male writers
21st-century American male writers
Novelists from New York (state)
1960 births